Roughing filters provide pretreatment for turbid water or simple, low maintenance treatment  when high water quality is not needed.

External links 
SANDEC page
Blue filter Inc. (commercial site)
Rejuvenation of SSF using HRF technique

Appropriate technology
Water filters